Jakob Middendorp (Latin Jacobus Middendorpius) (Twente – 13 January 1611, Cologne) was a Dutch Catholic theologian and churchman, academic and historian.

Life
Middendorp was born about 1537 in Oldenzaal, or perhaps Ootmarsum, as he called himself Otmersensis on the title page of his work . He studied the humanities at the Fragerherren gymnasium of Zwolle, philosophy and jurisprudence at Cologne University, where he became doctor of philosophy and both branches of law, and also licentiate of theology; he also taught peripatetic philosophy at the Montanum gymnasium there.

He remained in Westphalia during the troubles in the Archdiocese of Cologne in the time of Archbishop Gebhard Truchsess von Waldburg, and was professor at various foreign academies; afterwards he returned to Cologne, where he passed the greater part of his life. In 1580 he became dean of St. Maria ad gradus, Cologne, in 1596 dean of St. Andreas, and in 1601 canon of the cathedral chapter. Rector of Cologne University from 1580 to 1581 and from 1602 to 1604, he was appointed vice-chancellor by the coadjutor, Ferdinand of Bavaria, in 1602. He lies buried in the church of St. Andreas.

Works
As an author he was best known by his , a pioneer work in the history of education and universities. It gave legendary foundations for European higher education, and its history was contaminated by the forgeries of Annius of Viterbo, factors leading to its being discounted by later authors.

He also published:
 (Cologne, 1570); 
 (Cologne, 1603); 
 (Cologne, 1603).

Notes

References

Attribution

External links
 :s:de:ADB:Middendorp, Jacob
 DNBL page

1530s births
1611 deaths
Year of birth uncertain
16th-century Dutch Roman Catholic theologians
17th-century Dutch historians
People from Twente
Rectors of the University of Cologne
17th-century Dutch Roman Catholic theologians